The fundamental theorem of calculus is a theorem that links the concept of differentiating a function (calculating its slopes, or rate of change at each time) with the concept of integrating a function (calculating the area under its graph, or the cumulative effect of small contributions). The two operations are inverses of each other apart from a constant value which depends on where one starts to compute area.

This implies the existence of antiderivatives for continuous functions.

Conversely, the second part of the theorem, the second fundamental theorem of calculus, states that the integral of a function  over a fixed interval is equal to the change of any antiderivative  between the ends of the interval. This greatly simplifies the calculation of a definite integral provided an antiderivative can be found by symbolic integration, thus avoiding numerical integration.

History

The fundamental theorem of calculus relates differentiation and integration, showing that these two operations are essentially inverses of one another. Before the discovery of this theorem, it was not recognized that these two operations were related. Ancient Greek mathematicians knew how to compute area via infinitesimals, an operation that we would now call integration. The origins of differentiation likewise predate the fundamental theorem of calculus by hundreds of years; for example, in the fourteenth century the notions of continuity of functions and motion were studied by the Oxford Calculators and other scholars. The historical relevance of the fundamental theorem of calculus is not the ability to calculate these operations, but the realization that the two seemingly distinct operations (calculation of geometric areas, and calculation of gradients) are actually closely related.

From the conjecture and the proof of the fundamental theorem of calculus, calculus as a unified theory of integration and differentiation is started. The first published statement and proof of a rudimentary form of the fundamental theorem, strongly geometric in character, was by James Gregory (1638–1675). Isaac Barrow (1630–1677) proved a more generalized version of the theorem, while his student Isaac Newton (1642–1727) completed the development of the surrounding mathematical theory. Gottfried Leibniz (1646–1716) systematized the knowledge into a calculus for infinitesimal quantities and introduced the notation used today.

Geometric meaning

The first fundamental theorem may be interpreted as follows. The area  may be not easily computable, but it is assumed to be well defined.

In other words, the area of this "strip" would be .

There is another way to estimate the area of this same strip. So:

In fact, this estimate becomes a perfect equality if we add the red "Excess" area in the diagram. So:

Rearranging terms:

As  approaches  in the limit, the last fraction must go to zero.

Thus:
Therefore, the left-hand side also tends to zero, and:

That is, the derivative of the area function  exists and is equal to the original function , so the area function is an antiderivative of the original function. 

Thus, the derivative of the integral of a function (the area) is the original function, so that derivative and integral are inverse operations which reverse each other. This is the essence of the Fundamental Theorem.

Physical intuition
Intuitively, the fundamental theorem states that integration and differentiation are essentially inverse operations which reverse each other.

The second fundamental theorem says that the sum of infinitesimal changes in a quantity over time (the integral of the derivative of the quantity) adds up to the net change in the quantity. To visualize this, imagine traveling in a car and wanting to know the distance traveled (the net change in position along the highway). You can see the velocity on the speedometer but cannot look out to see your location. Each second, you can find how far the car has traveled using , multiplying the current speed (in kilometers or miles per hour) by the time interval (1 second =  hour). Summing up all these small steps, you can calculate the total distance traveled, without ever looking outside the car:As  becomes infinitesimally small, the summing up corresponds to integration. Thus, the integral of the velocity function (the derivative of position) computes how far the car has traveled (the net change in position).

The first fundamental theorem says that any quantity is the rate of change (the derivative) of the integral of the quantity from a fixed time up to a variable time. Continuing the above example, if you imagine a velocity function, you can integrate it from the starting time up to any given time to obtain a distance function whose derivative is the given velocity. (To obtain the highway-marker position, you need to add your starting position to this integral.)

Formal statements
There are two parts to the theorem. The first part deals with the derivative of an antiderivative, while the second part deals with the relationship between antiderivatives and definite integrals.

First part
This part is sometimes referred to as the first fundamental theorem of calculus.

Let  be a continuous real-valued function defined on a closed interval .

Corollary

The fundamental theorem is often employed to compute the definite integral of a function  for which an antiderivative  is known.

The corollary assumes continuity on the whole interval. This result is strengthened slightly in the following part of the theorem.

Second part
This part is sometimes referred to as the second fundamental theorem of calculus or the Newton–Leibniz axiom.

If  is Riemann integrable on  then

The second part is somewhat stronger than the corollary because it does not assume that  is continuous.

Also, by the first part of the theorem, antiderivatives of  always exist when  is continuous.

Proof of the first part
For a given function , define the function  as

the latter equality resulting from the basic properties of integrals and the additivity of areas.

According to the mean value theorem for integration, there exists a real number  such that

It follows that

and thus that

that is, 

Proof of the corollary
Let

Letting , we have

which means . In other words, and so

Proof of the second part
This is a limit proof by Riemann sums.

To begin, we recall the mean value theorem.

Begin with the quantity . Let there be numbers  such that

It follows that

Now, we add each  along with its additive inverse, so that the resulting quantity is equal:

The above quantity can be written as the following sum:

The function  is differentiable on the interval  and continuous on the closed interval ; therefore, it is also differentiable on each interval  and continuous on each interval .

Substituting the above into, we get

We are describing the area of a rectangle, with the width times the height, and we are adding the areas together. Each rectangle, by virtue of the mean value theorem, describes an approximation of the curve section it is drawn over. What we have to do is approximate the curve with  rectangles. Now, as the size of the partitions get smaller and  increases, resulting in more partitions to cover the space, we get closer and closer to the actual area of the curve.

By taking the limit of the expression as the norm of the partitions approaches zero, we arrive at the Riemann integral. We know that this limit exists because  was assumed to be integrable. That is, we take the limit as the largest of the partitions approaches zero in size, so that all other partitions are smaller and the number of partitions approaches infinity.

This gives us

Therefore, we obtain

which completes the proof.

Relationship between the parts

As discussed above, a slightly weaker version of the second part follows from the first part.

Similarly, it almost looks like the first part of the theorem follows directly from the second. Then by the second theorem, . Now, suppose . This argument only works, however, if we already know that  has an antiderivative, and the only way we know that all continuous functions have antiderivatives is by the first part of the Fundamental Theorem.
For example, if , then  has an antiderivative, namely

and there is no simpler expression for this function. It is therefore important not to interpret the second part of the theorem as the definition of the integral. Indeed, there are many functions that are integrable but lack elementary antiderivatives, and discontinuous functions can be integrable but lack any antiderivatives at all. Conversely, many functions that have antiderivatives are not Riemann integrable (see Volterra's function).

Examples

Computing a particular integral
Suppose the following is to be calculated:

Here,  and we can use  as the antiderivative. Therefore:

Using the first part
Suppose

is to be calculated. Using the first part of the theorem with  gives

Note that this can also be checked using the second part of the theorem.

An integral where the corollary is insufficient
Suppose

Then  is not continuous at zero. Therefore, the corollary cannot be used to compute

But consider the function

Theoretical example
The theorem can be used to prove that

Since, 

the result follows from,

Generalizations
The function  does not have to be continuous over the whole interval.

We can relax the conditions on  still further and suppose that it is merely locally integrable. In that case, we can conclude that the function  is differentiable almost everywhere and  almost everywhere. On the real line this statement is equivalent to Lebesgue's differentiation theorem. These results remain true for the Henstock–Kurzweil integral, which allows a larger class of integrable functions.

Part II of the theorem is true for any Lebesgue integrable function , which has an antiderivative  (not all integrable functions do, though).

This result may fail for continuous functions  that admit a derivative  at almost every point , as the example of the Cantor function shows. Conversely, if  is any integrable function, then  as given in the first formula will be absolutely continuous with  almost everywhere.

The conditions of this theorem may again be relaxed by considering the integrals involved as Henstock–Kurzweil integrals. The difference here is that the integrability of  does not need to be assumed.

The version of Taylor's theorem, which expresses the error term as an integral, can be seen as a generalization of the fundamental theorem.

Then for every curve , the curve integral can be computed as

The fundamental theorem can be generalized to curve and surface integrals in higher dimensions and on manifolds. One such generalization offered by the calculus of moving surfaces is the time evolution of integrals. The most familiar extensions of the fundamental theorem of calculus in higher dimensions are the divergence theorem and the gradient theorem.

If  denotes the boundary of  given its induced orientation, then

Here  is the exterior derivative, which is defined using the manifold structure only.

The theorem is often used in situations where  is an embedded oriented submanifold of some bigger manifold (e.g. ) on which the form  is defined.

The fundamental theorem of calculus allows us to pose a definite integral as a first-order ordinary differential equation.

can be posed as

See also

 Differentiation under the integral sign
 Telescoping series
 Fundamental theorem of calculus for line integrals
 Notation for differentiation

Notes

References

Bibliography

 .
 .
 .

Further reading

 .
 .
 Malet, A., Studies on James Gregorie (1638-1675) (PhD Thesis, Princeton, 1989).
 Hernandez Rodriguez, O. A.; Lopez Fernandez, J. M. . "Teaching the Fundamental Theorem of Calculus: A Historical Reflection", Loci: Convergence (MAA), January 2012.
 .
 .

External links

 
 James Gregory's Euclidean Proof of the Fundamental Theorem of Calculus at Convergence
 Isaac Barrow's proof of the Fundamental Theorem of Calculus
 Fundamental Theorem of Calculus at imomath.com
 Alternative proof of the fundamental theorem of calculus
 Fundamental Theorem of Calculus MIT.
 Fundamental Theorem of Calculus Mathworld.

Articles containing proofs
Theorems in calculus
Theorems in real analysis